Zagradec pri Grosupljem is a settlement southeast of Grosuplje in central Slovenia. The area is part of the historical region of Lower Carniola and is included in the Central Slovenia Statistical Region.

Name
The name of the settlement was changed from Zagradec to Zagradec pri Grosupljem in 1955. In the past the German name was Zagratz.

References

External links

Zagradec pri Grosupljem on Geopedia

Populated places in the Municipality of Grosuplje